Sarah Onyango Obama (1922 – March 29, 2021) was a Kenyan educator and philanthropist. She was the third wife of Hussein Onyango Obama, the paternal grandfather of U.S. president Barack Obama and helped raise his father, Barack Obama Sr. She was known by her short name as Sarah Obama and was sometimes referred to as Sarah Ogwel, Sarah Hussein Obama, or Sarah Anyango Obama. She lived in Nyang'oma Kogelo village, 48 km (30 miles) west of western Kenya's main city, Kisumu, on the edge of Lake Victoria.

Biography
As a young woman, Sarah Obama helped raise her stepson Barack Obama Sr. She was a firm believer in quality early education and regularly took him on her bicycle to primary school so that he could get the education she had been denied. 

She first met her step grandson, Barack Obama II, the future President of the United States, during his visit to Kenya in 1988. Although she was not a blood relation, Barack Obama called her "Granny Sarah". In addition to mentioning her in his memoir Dreams from My Father, he spoke about her in his 2014 speech to the United Nations General Assembly. Sarah, who spoke Luo and only a few words of English, communicated with President Obama through an interpreter. 

During the U.S. presidential campaign of 2008, she protested attempts to portray Obama as a foreigner to the United States or as a Muslim, saying that while Obama's grandfather had been a Muslim, "In the world of today, children have different religions from their parents."  At one point in her life, she worked as a cook for Christian missionaries, but Sarah Obama was "a strong believer of the Islamic faith", in her words. On July 4, 2008, she attended the United States Independence Day celebrations in Nairobi, hosted by Michael Ranneberger, the U.S. ambassador in Kenya. The following year, she attended Barack Obama's first presidential inauguration.

In 2010, she created the Mama Sarah Obama Foundation to provide food and education to orphans, even sheltering some of them in her home.

On the occasion of the inaugural Women’s Entrepreneurship Day (November 19, 2014) at the United Nations, Sarah Obama received the Pioneer Award in Education honoring the work of her foundation. Upon her acceptance of the award, she explained, "Our vision is a world where children are nurtured and supported physically, educationally, and emotionally to thrive and succeed in life."

On March 29, 2021 it was announced that Obama had died at the age of 99, in a hospital in Kisumu, Western Kenya, having suffered with an undisclosed illness a few days earlier. Following her death, Kenyan President Uhuru Kenyatta issued a statement praising Obama as strong, virtuous, and "an icon of family values".

References

External links

1920s births
2021 deaths
Year of birth uncertain
20th-century Kenyan educators
20th-century women educators
Kenyan Muslims
Kenyan philanthropists
Kenyan women
Luo people
Obama family
People from Siaya County
Women philanthropists